Riaz Ahmed (born 11 September 1941) is a Pakistani field hockey player. He won a gold medal at the 1968 Summer Olympics in Mexico City, and a silver medal at the 1972 Summer Olympics in Munich.

References

External links
 

Olympic silver medalists for Pakistan
Pakistani male field hockey players
Olympic field hockey players of Pakistan
Olympic gold medalists for Pakistan
Olympic medalists in field hockey
Medalists at the 1968 Summer Olympics
Medalists at the 1972 Summer Olympics
Field hockey players at the 1968 Summer Olympics
Field hockey players at the 1972 Summer Olympics
Asian Games medalists in field hockey
Field hockey players at the 1970 Asian Games
Asian Games gold medalists for Pakistan
Medalists at the 1970 Asian Games
1941 births
Living people
20th-century Pakistani people